Stig Lindewall (born 15 August 1936) is a Swedish gymnast. He competed at the 1960 Summer Olympics and the 1964 Summer Olympics.

References

1936 births
Living people
Swedish male artistic gymnasts
Olympic gymnasts of Sweden
Gymnasts at the 1960 Summer Olympics
Gymnasts at the 1964 Summer Olympics
Sportspeople from Stockholm